Irina Aleksandrovna Kolpakova (born 22 May 1933) is a Soviet and Russian ballerina, choreographer and pedagogue. People's Artist of the USSR (1965) and Hero of Socialist Labour (1983).

Biography 
She was the prima ballerina of the Kirov State Academic Theatre of Opera and Ballet (now the Mariinsky Theatre) in Saint Petersburg. From 1974 to 1979, she served as a deputy of the Supreme Soviet of the Soviet Union.

In the 1990s, she worked for several seasons as choreographer and coach at the American Ballet Theatre in New York City. She is currently a professor of classical dance at the Vaganova Academy of Russian Ballet in Saint Petersburg and a ballet coach at American Ballet Theatre.

She is married to the noted ballet dancer Vladilen Semyonov, also a People's Artist of the USSR. They live in the Tolstoy House building in Saint Petersburg.

Awards and honors 

 Honored Artist of the RSFSR (1957)
 People's Artist of the RSFSR (1960)
 People's Artist of the USSR (1965)
 Two Orders of the Red Banner of Labour (1967, 1971)
 USSR State Prize (1980)
 Order of Lenin (1983)
 Hero of Socialist Labour (1983)

See also
List of Russian ballet dancers

References

External links
Brief biography at Soviet Screen website 

1933 births
20th-century Russian ballet dancers
Living people
Dancers from Saint Petersburg
Communist Party of the Soviet Union members
Members of the Supreme Soviet of the Russian Soviet Federative Socialist Republic, 1963–1967
Ninth convocation members of the Supreme Soviet of the Soviet Union
Heroes of Socialist Labour
Honored Artists of the RSFSR
People's Artists of the RSFSR
People's Artists of the USSR
Recipients of the Order of Lenin
Recipients of the Order of the Red Banner of Labour
Recipients of the USSR State Prize
Ballet choreographers
Ballet teachers
Mariinsky Ballet dancers
Prima ballerinas
Prix Benois de la Danse jurors
Russian ballerinas
Russian choreographers
Soviet ballerinas
Soviet choreographers